Arab Hasan (also Romanized as ‘Arab Ḩasan) is a village in Miyan Ab Rural District, in the Central District of Shushtar County, Khuzestan Province, Iran. At the 2006 census, its population was 2,107, in 356 families.

References 

Populated places in Shushtar County